Counter-experience describes a perception of a non-objective (typically spiritual) phenomenon. First coined by French phenomenologist Jean-Luc Marion, it has been elevated to book title status by Marion scholar Kevin Hart.

Contrast with experience
One may experience physical objects using the five senses. In contrast, one may counter-experience revelation, a spiritual presence, or an awareness. Feelings of sublimity or awe are often indicators of counter-experience.

References

20th-century philosophy
Continental philosophy
Phenomenology
Perception